Rho Ursae Majoris (ρ UMa) is the Bayer designation for a solitary star in the northern circumpolar constellation of Ursa Major. It is faintly visible to the naked eye with an apparent visual magnitude of 4.74. The distance to this star, based upon an annual parallax shift of 10.37 mas, is around 315 light years.

With a stellar classification of M3 III, this is a red giant star on the asymptotic giant branch. It is a suspected small amplitude variable. It is radiating 464 times the solar luminosity from its outer atmosphere at an effective temperature of about 3,725 K. Based upon its motion through space, there is a 60.6% chance that this star is a member of the Sirius stream.

Naming
With π1, π2, σ1, σ2, A and d, it composed the Arabic asterism Al Ṭhibā᾽, the Gazelle. According to the catalogue of stars in the Technical Memorandum 33-507 - A Reduced Star Catalog Containing 537 Named Stars, Al Ṭhibā were the title for seven stars : A as Althiba I, π1 as Althiba II, π2 as Althiba III, this star (ρ) as Althiba IV, σ1 as Althiba V, σ2 as Althiba VI, and d as Althiba VII

References

M-type giants
Ursa Major (constellation)
Ursae Majoris, Rho
Durchmusterung objects
076827
Ursae Majoris, 08
044390
3576
Althiba IV